Geitlerinema is a genus of cyanobacteria belonging to the family Coleofasciculaceae.

The genus was first described by K. Anagnostidis in 1989. The genus name of Geitlerinema is in honour of Lothar Geitler (1899 – 1990), who was an Austrian botanist and cytologist.

The genus has cosmopolitan distribution.

Species:
 Geitlerinema amphibium
 Geitlerinema splendidum

References

Oscillatoriales
Cyanobacteria genera